Qozlu or Kozlu may refer to:
Qozlu, Kalbajar, Azerbaijan
Qozlu, Lachin, Azerbaijan
Qozlu, Ardabil, Iran
Qozlu, West Azerbaijan (disambiguation), Iran

See also
Quzlu (disambiguation), places in Iran
Kozlu, Zonguldak, Turkey